Felipe de Jesús Almaguer Torres (born 21 February 1974) is a Mexican politician affiliated with the PAN. He currently serves as Deputy of the LXII Legislature of the Mexican Congress representing San Luis Potosí.

References

1974 births
Living people
People from San Luis Potosí City
National Action Party (Mexico) politicians
21st-century Mexican politicians
Politicians from San Luis Potosí
Universidad Autónoma de San Luis Potosí alumni
Members of the Congress of San Luis Potosí
Deputies of the LXII Legislature of Mexico
Members of the Chamber of Deputies (Mexico) for San Luis Potosí